Narameikhla Min Saw Mon (Arakanese transliteration: Meng Sao Mwan,; also known as Suleiman Shah; 1380–1433) was the last king of Launggyet Dynasty and the founder of Mrauk-U Dynasty of Arakan.

He became king in 1404 but was driven out of Launggyet in 1406 by Crown Prince Minye Kyawswa of Ava. He sought refuge in the Bengal Sultanate, and later entered the military service of Sultan Jalaluddin Muhammad Shah. In 1429, he reclaimed the Arakanese throne with the help of the sultan, and ruled the kingdom. He founded a new capital, Mrauk-U, in 1430 at a more strategic location. The king died in 1433, and was succeeded by his younger brother Khayi.

Early life
The future king was born in 1380/81 (742 ME) to Prince Razathu II and Princess Saw Nyet Htwa of Launggyet Kingdom, located in modern northern Rakhine State. The young prince's teenage years were drawn into court politics, and his fortunes were closely tied to those of his father. His father Razathu became king but he was deposed in 1395. He regained the throne in 1397 until his death in 1401. Razathu's younger brother Theinkhathu succeeded Razathu, who died in 1404.

Last king of Launggyet
When Saw Mon ascended to the throne in April 1404, the Arakanese (Rakhine) kingdom had been on its last legs for three decades. The kingdom had seen seemingly endless episodes of political instability and interference from its two stronger neighbors to the east Ava Kingdom (Ava) and Hanthawaddy Kingdom (Pegu). In 1373/74 (735 ME), the Launggyet court had to ask for a nominee from Ava, which sent Saw Mon II. Saw Mon II was a good ruler but died in 1381 without an heir. Ava sent another nominee. The new king proved to be a tyrant, and was driven out by the court in 1385/86. From 1385/86 to 1404, the Arakanese throne was subject to rival factions of the court, often supported by Ava and Pegu.

Saw Mon could not escape the commotion either. Within two years of Saw Mon's accession, the kingdom was drawn into the Forty Years' War between Ava and Pegu. In November 1406, King Minkhaung I of Ava sent in troops led by its crown prince Minye Kyawswa. Ava troops overran Launggyet on 29 November 1406 (Monday, 5th waning of Natdaw 768 ME). Minkhaung I appointed Anawrahta Saw, then governor of Kalay, to be "king" of Arakan.

Saw Mon barely escaped to Bengal with a few of his retinue.

Exile years and restoration
Arakan was to be a battlefield between Ava and Pegu for the next six years. Pegu finally got the upper hand in Arakan in 1412, and placed its nominees in Launggyet and Sandoway (Thandwe). Ava set up a rival outpost in North Arakan at Khwethin-Taung in 1413 but the western principality was spared further warfare as Ava focused on finishing off Pegu. Ava came close but could not topple Pegu. The Avan garrison at Khwethin-Taung was also driven out in 1416 by the local northern Arakanese. A divided Arakan was tributary to Pegu at least until King Razadarit's death in 1421. It is not clear if then vassal kings remained loyal to the successors of Razadarit. The Arakanese chronicle Rakhine Razawin Thit notes at least two rival courts—one at Launggyet and one at Sandoway.

Meanwhile Saw Mon had entered the service of Sultan Jalaluddin Muhammad Shah of Bengal, and proved to be a good commander. He became close to the sultan, and convinced the sultan to help him regain the Arakanese throne. The sultan agreed. In February/March 1429 (Tabaung 790 ME), Saw Mon aided by troops "largely made up of Afghan adventurers" invaded Arakan. The first attempt at the invasion failed because Saw Mon got into an argument with Gen. Wali Khan of Bengal, and was imprisoned by the general. Saw Mon escaped, and the sultan agreed to another attempt. The second invasion went well. Saw Mon was proclaimed king at Launggyet on 18 April 1429 (Thursday, 1st waning of Kason 791 ME). (According to some Arakanese chronicles, such as Inzauk Razawin, the second invasion took place in 1430, a year later.)

Founder of Mrauk-U Kingdom

Saw Mon became king of Arakan but as a vassal of Bengal. His domain was still restricted to northern Arakan where southern Arakan (Sandoway (Thandwe)) was still independent. He decided to move the capital from Launggyet. The new capital, though not far from Launggyet, was much more strategically located, and would prove much more difficult for invaders to attack. He founded the new capital of Mrauk-U on 16 November 1430 (Sunday, 1st waxing of Natdaw 792 ME) (or 20 August 1430 / Sunday, 1st waxing of Tawthalin 792).

According to the Arakanese chronicles, the king was warned by court astrologers that he would die within a year of foundation of the new capital. He answered that he would rather die to have a safer kingdom for the posterity than to live long, and leave a weak kingdom. The king promptly moved to the new capital when it was completed in 1432/33 (794 ME). Part of the new city, a few miles north of the Mrauk-U Palace, was the Le-myet-hna Temple.

He died soon after on 9 May 1433 (Saturday, 6th waning of Kason 795 ME). He was succeeded by his younger half-brother Khayi.

Notes

References

Bibliography
 
 
 
 
 

Monarchs of Launggyet
Burmese Theravada Buddhists
1380 births
1433 deaths
15th-century Burmese monarchs